Aggi Pidugu is a 1964 Indian Telugu-language swashbuckler film, produced and directed by B. Vittalacharya under the Sri Vital Combines banner. It stars N. T. Rama Rao, Krishna Kumari and Rajasree, with music composed by Rajan–Nagendra. The film is based on the 1844 French novella The Corsican Brothers, written by Alexandre Dumas. The film was dubbed into Tamil with the title Veeraadhi Veeran and released in the same year.

Plot
Once upon on time a kingdom ruled by a king Mahendra, his younger brother Veerendra hoped he would inherit the throne because his brother is childless. However, Veerendra is disappointed as Mahendra is blessed with twins in his late life. Since the infants are conjoined, it was thought they wouldn't survive. However, a British doctor in the Royal employment came to the rescue and separated them by surgery. The boys are named Raja and Madhav. On their naming ceremony day, Veerendra suddenly attacks and slaughters his brother & sister-in-law and also tries to kill the twins. But the latter was hidden from his eyes by Veerayya, a personal servant of Mahendra and the doctor. Unable to find the kids, Veerendra sets the palace on fire assuming the children are still inside. Staring at the palace on fire, and with tearful eyes, Veerayya and Doctor vow to raise the twins into adulthood and secure them their royal throne. With a fear that the twins living together would raise suspicion, the Doctor keeps with him the elder boy Madhav. Veerayya takes Raja with him to rear him in the forest.

Years roll by, Raja and Madhav have a strange bond between them when Madhav undergoes a certain feeling, the other also is affected. Raja falls in love with a village belle called Roja, whereas Madhav imbibes modern habits and wins the heart of a girl called Malathi (Krishna Kumari). Veerendra's excesses know no bounds; he usurped the throne. One day, Raja angrily rushes into the royal court in its full session after knowing that Veerendra's soldiers had tormented the villagers. Raja beats Veerendra's henchmen to a pulp and frees his own men from the village. Veerendra was aghast wondering about the young man striking like thunder. Veerayya asks the doctor what should be done, out of his fear that Veerendra has seen Raja. It is time for the reunion of the brothers. They will have to make a claim for their rights. With these points in mind, Veerayya and the doctor introduced the siblings to each other in front of their parents’ cemeteries. They embrace each other while pledging to bring peace to the souls perished in the ashes of the palace fire. Raja rushes to the fort to kill Veerendra. As his efforts to appease Raja go in vain, Madhav runs after him who intervenes and requests his uncle to justly and peacefully surrender their kingdom. In the meantime, Vedanda, the right-hand of Veerendra throws a knife at Raja that fells him to the ground. Watching all this, Madhav turns wild and makes everyone helpless and retreats from the scene along with his brother.

Veerendra is left clueless how his brother's sons are alive. So, he sends Vedanda to find the twins' whereabouts. Madhav and the doctor are just retreating after having dressed Raja's wounds. Vedanda happened to come there while he is in the hunt for the twins. Then, Madhav sees Vedanda and his followers insulting the modesty of lonesome Madhav. He thrashed and chased them away. The doctor happened to see them when they were fleeing. The doctor dutifully tends to their wounds. Veerendra gets suspicious after learning the above. He wondered what a doctor has anything to do with the forest. He thought that the doctor had something to do with some treason. He made a vain attempt to reach the doctor's home to find out the truth. But he forgets; he came there once and saw Malathi. She came there to see Madhav. Veerendra decides to marry, whatever the case. He learns that she is the daughter of Rangaraju, who is one among his staff. He goes to Rangaraju's house along with his soldiers. When Malathi declined his love proposal, Veerendra secured their house with his soldiers and kept them under house arrest. Madhav learned about this and goes there in disguise and releases them intact. Madhav takes Malathi to Veerayya to provide shelter. Veerendra finds out the foul play and sends his soldiers to get Malathi. Raja sees Malathi for the first time, he feels her as his dream girl and tries to advance with her. Veerayya scolds him and tells him that she is the fiancé of his brother Madhav. Raja starts hating himself, he goes to the doctor's house and asks him to give him poison. The Doctor interacts with him by telling the unique strange relation between the brothers and reminds him of their debt. Malathi is frightened on seeing Raja and flees. Vedenda captures her and takes her to Veerendra. Meanwhile, Madhav could not find Malathi, suspects his brother Raja and both start fighting. Roja comes and says that Malathi escaped. Madhav starts to rescue Malathi. Veerendra decides to marry Malathi, he also captivates the Doctor and Veerayya. Now Madhav enters the scene as a diamond merchant and gains the confidence of Veerendra. During the time of the marriage, Madhav snatches the wedding chain from Veerendra's hand and unties Malathi. Veerendra arrests him and starts beating him. Raja comes to his rescue and both of them stamp out Veerendra. The movie ends with the marriages of Madhav and Malathi, and Raja and Roja.

Cast
N. T. Rama Rao as Raja & Madhav (dual role)
Krishna Kumari as Malathi
Rajasree as Roja
Rajanala as Veerendrudu 
V. Nagayya as Veeraiah
Satyanarayana as Vedanda
Mukkamala as Doctor 
Balakrishna 
Maduukuri Satyam 
Jayanthi 
Brundavana Chowdary

Soundtrack

Music composed by Rajan–Nagendra. The song Emo Emo Idhi is a blockbuster. Music released by AVM Audio Company.

References

External links
 - A song sung by S. Janaki and L. R. Eswari from the Tamil version film

1960s historical adventure films
Twins in Indian films
Films based on The Corsican Brothers
Films scored by Rajan–Nagendra
Films directed by B. Vittalacharya
Indian historical adventure films
1960s Telugu-language films